Elasmopus arafura is a marine species of amphipod in the family, Maeridae, and was first described in 2011 by Lauren E. Hughes and James K. Lowry.

It is found in the seas off Western Australia and the Northern Territory in the IMCRA regions of the Northern Shelf Province,  the Northwest Shelf Province and the Central Western Province.

References

Crustaceans described in 2011
Taxa named by James K. Lowry
Taxa named by Lauren E. Hughes
Amphipoda